Till the Wheels Fall Off is a B-sides and rarities compilation album by the Gainesville, Florida-based band Hot Water Music.

Track listing

Hot Water Music albums